Michael Ortiz may refer to:
 J. Michael Ortiz, American educator and president of Cal Poly Pomona
 Michael Ortiz (mathematician) (born 1954), American scientist and researcher 
 Shooting of Michael Ortiz